Cerebral creatine deficiencies  are a small group of inherited disorders that result from defects in creatine biosynthesis and utilization.  Commonly affected tissues include the brain and muscles.  There are three distinct CCDs.  The most common is creatine transporter defect (CTD), an X-linked disorder caused by pathogenic variants in SLC6A8. The main symptoms of CTD are intellectual disability and developmental delay, and these are caused by a lack of creatine in the brain, due to the defective transporter.  There are also two enzymatic defects of creatine biosynthesis, arginine:glycine amidinotransferase deficiency (AGAT deficiency), caused by variants in GATM and guanidinoacetate methyltransferase deficiency (GAMT deficiency), caused by variants in GAMT.  The single enzyme defects are both inherited in an autosomal recessive manner.

Creatine is synthesized in the kidney and liver, by a two step enzymatic process.  In the first step, glycine and arginine are combined by arginine:glycine amidinotransferase to form guanidinoacetate.  This step also results in the production of ornithine.  Creatine is produced by the enzyme guanidinoacetate methyltransferase.  After production in the liver and kidneys, creatine is transported to organs and tissues with high energy demands, most commonly the brain and skeletal muscles.  In addition to endogenous production, creatine can be obtained from dietary sources or supplementation.  Ornithine aminotransferase deficiency can cause secondary creatine deficiency, however it does not result in cerebral creatine deficiency.


Signs and symptoms
The clinical findings in all three CCDs result from the consequences of decreased levels of creatine in tissues where it is required.  In affected individuals with all three disorders, there is an almost complete absence of creatine and phosphocreatine in the brain. The two tissues with the highest demands for creatine are the brain and skeletal muscles.  Muscular findings usually include weakness and decreased endurance.  Other clinical findings include seizures, intellectual disability and developmental delay.  Most affected individuals appear normal at birth, with clinical findings becoming apparent during the first year of life, and progressing.

Pathogenesis
Creatine is synthesized primarily in the liver and kidneys via a two-step enzymatic process.  Defects in either of these two enzymes can cause a CCD.  In order to pass the blood brain barrier, creatine requires a specialized transporter, encoded for by SLC6A8.  A defect in this transporter is responsible for the third CCD.

References

Genetic diseases and disorders
Amino acid metabolism disorders